Zoolander: Super Model is an American adult animated superhero comedy film directed by Aaron Augenblick and starring Ben Stiller, Owen Wilson, Tim Gunn and Nick Kroll. Based on the Zoolander characters created by Ben Stiller and Drake Sather, it was written by John Aboud and Michael Colton. The work was produced in 2011 as a series of short episodes with the intent of releasing it as a web television series, but the episodes were eventually packaged together as a film instead, and was released on Netflix in 2016 in the United Kingdom and Republic of Ireland. In May 2020, it was released worldwide on CBS All Access. This was Jerry Stiller's final voice acting role before his death on May 11, 2020.

It is a parody of 1980s Saturday morning cartoons, depicting Derek Zoolander and Hansel McDonald as superheroes. Ben Stiller, who oversaw the work's production, gave the writers notes asking them to tone down some of the jokes to keep it similar to the PG-13 content of the original film, so while it would still be geared towards adults, it wouldn't be so adult that younger viewers couldn't watch it.

Reception 
Yahoo! Movies' Ryan Leston wrote "Zoolander: Super Model has made it to Netflix as one streamable file with a runtime of 84 minutes… but it doesn't feel like one single story. Instead, it feels more like a miniseries that has been edited together and dumped online to cut its losses. Probably in the hope that no one would be stupid enough to watch it."

Cast
 Ben Stiller as Derek Zoolander
 Owen Wilson as Hansel McDonald
 Christine Taylor as Matilda Jeffries
 Jerry Stiller as Maury Ballstein
 Tim Gunn as himself
 Jenny Slate as Nani
 Nick Kroll as Frankie J-PEG
 Andrew Daly as Nani's Dad
 Jon Daly as The Paparocto
 Patton Oswalt as Dr. Botoxo
 Rashida Jones as D'Jangelo
 Heidi Klum as herself
 Leighton Meester as herself
 Katy Perry as herself
 Kim Kardashian as herself
 Khloé Kardashian as herself
 Julie Klausner
 James Adomian

References

External links
 

2016 films
Adult animated comedy films
2016 animated films
2016 comedy films
American adult animated films
American animated comedy films
2010s English-language films
2010s American films